Nero's Day at Disneyland was an American experimental breakcore musical project, created by Lauren Bousfield in Oakland, California. Her first album, Attention Shoppers, was released in 2005, followed by From Rotting Fantasylands in 2009. Though the project was cancelled in 2011, Bousfield continued to make music independently.

History

Formation (2005)

Nero's Day at Disneyland was founded 2005 in Oakland, California by Lauren Bousfield. She made two albums, one mashup album, and two EPs.

Rise to popularity and break-up (2005–2011)

In addition to albums and EPs, she released several singles (see Discography). In 2007, she contributed to the 3rd Volume of "The Fruit Will Rot". The band's last album was the 15-track "From Rotting Fantasylands", having at least 30 additional songs left over after the album's release. Nero's Day at Disneyland then separated for unknown reasons and Lauren came out as transgender, changing her name.

Solo career (2012-present)

Lauren Bousfield started producing music under her own name in 2012 with her first EP Locked Into Phantasy and later on Avalon Vales in 2013. She released six singles in January 2016 and later a soundtrack for the physics-based puzzle game called Nebulous on Steam. In July 2020, Bousfield released the album Palimpsest. She has also been a part of Hans Zimmer's Remote Control Productions, working as a score technical assistant on Kung Fu Panda 3 and Batman v Superman: Dawn of Justice.

On September 27, 2016, Lauren's apartment caught on fire in Los Angeles and she was later hospitalized, losing all of her belongings. She was given skin grafts on her hands, due to 3rd-degree burns, for 2 months. She ran on Medi-cal during the hospitalization, which later on fans started donating to Lauren for her medical funds on PayPal and GoFundMe. She later recovered in December and made the Fire Songs EP, mourning the loss of the Ghost Ship fire.

On December 9, 2016, fans of Bousfield's work compiled a variety of the artist's unreleased songs into an unofficial album titled Heaven's Gate, after one of the songs featured on the project. Heaven's Gate consists of thirty-five singles produced by Bousfield as Nero's Day At Disneyland, most of which were taken from Bousfield's SoundCloud.

Discography 
Before Nero's Day at Disneyland

 Rock and Roll Mind Control - Beautiful Mutants (circa. 1998)
 Who Feeds On Whom - Beautiful Mutants (circa. 1999)
 Beautiful Mutants - Beautiful Mutants (circa. 2000)

As Nero's Day at Disneyland

Studio albums
 Attention Shoppers (2005)
 Trickle Down Economixxx (2008)
 From Rotting Fantasylands (2009)
 Heaven's Gate (Unofficial/Fan Project) (2016)

EPs
 Grievances And Dead Malls EP (2005)
 Colonists (2007)

Singles
 Mascara Running Everywhere (2010)
 Bent Chorals feat. Mincemeat Or Tenspeed (2010)
 Heaven's Gate (2011)
 Sable Leathery Wings (2011)

As Lauren Bousfield

Studio albums 
 Avalon Vales (2013)
 Namazu Running OST (2016)
 Palimpsest (2020)

EPs 
 Locked into Phantasy (2012)
 Fire Songs (2017)

Singles 
 Valed (2013)
 Dead Eyes (2016)
 Clocked (2016)
 Slow Slicing/Klonopin (2016)
 Flying High (2016)
 Scold's Bridle (2016)
 Fukup feat. Skylla (2016)
 Used To Be Better feat. Girls Rituals (2017)
 Press Fire from No World Dreamers: Sticky Zeitgeist (2017)

As In House Pharmacy

Studio albums 
 Tetsuo: The Iron Man Revisted (2018)
 We Are Electronics and Piano Only (2020)

References

External links
 Nero's Day at Disneyland on Spotify
 Nero's Day at Disneyland on SoundCloud
 Lauren Bousfield on Bandcamp
 Nero's Day at Disneyland on Facebook
 Lauren Bousfield Medical Bill Support Page  Retrieved 28 September 2016
 Lauren Bousfield's Fire Songs Honors Ghost Ship Victims and Her Own Fire Trauma Retrieved 24 June 2017

Breakcore
Experimental musicians
Songwriters from California
Musical groups established in 2005
American women in electronic music
Transgender women musicians
2005 establishments in California
American LGBT musicians